Anatoly Tikhonovich Gladilin (21 August 1935 — 24 October 2018) was a Soviet and Russian writer and poet who defected from the Soviet Union in 1976 and subsequently lived in Paris.

Biography 
In the 1960s, he was one of the most famous and promising young Russian authors, along with Vasily Aksyonov. In Paris, Gladilin worked for the Radio Liberty and the Deutsche Welle. Among his published works in the West was a novel, FSSR: The French Soviet Socialist Republic —  a tale of a Communist coup in France.

Gladilin was awarded the Medal of Pushkin in 2012.

Selected works
 Brigantine Raises Sails,  Moscow: Soviet Writer, 1959.
 Going Ahead, Moscow: Young Guard, 1962.
 Forecast for Tomorrow, Frankfurt: Possev, 1972.
 Dreams of the Schlusselburg Fortress, Moscow: Politizdat, 1974.
The Making and Unmaking of a Soviet Writer: My Story of the  Young Prose of the Sixties and After, Ardis, 1979.
Moscow Racetrack: A Novel of Espionage at the Track (trans. J.G. Tucker and R. P. Schoenberg), Ardis, 1990.
 Rogues, Welcome to Paris!, Moscow: Zakharov, 2007.

References

External links

 Anatoly Gladilin

1935 births
2018 deaths
Russian male novelists
Russian male poets
Soviet novelists
Soviet male writers
20th-century Russian male writers
Soviet dissidents
Recipients of the Medal of Pushkin
Soviet emigrants to France
20th-century Russian poets
20th-century Russian novelists
21st-century Russian poets
21st-century Russian novelists
21st-century male writers
Writers from Moscow